High Maintenance 90210 is an American reality series that premiered on the E!: Entertainment Television network on January 1, 2007.

Synopsis
The show follows a group of Beverly Hills butlers, nannies, and chefs as they perform a variety of jobs for a very selective and wealthy clientele. Various clients contact Jack Lippman, owner of the Elizabeth Rose Agency, who sends out potential employees to the homes of the clients. Each employee attempts to meet the demands of their extremely picky clients in hopes of earning a permanent position.

Cast
Jack Lippman - Owner of the Elizabeth Rose Agency
Julie Swales - Head of the Elizabeth Rose Agency's nanny division
Marcel Cicot - Personal chef
Brian Armstrong - Butler
Lucy Treadway - Nanny
Norwood Young - R&B singer, employed Brian Armstrong as his personal butler
Christina Fulton - Actress looking for a personal assistant

Episodes

References

External links
High Maintenance 90210 @ E! Online
 

2007 American television series debuts
2007 American television series endings
2000s American reality television series
E! original programming
English-language television shows
Television shows set in Los Angeles